In Morocco, the 75 second-level administrative subdivisions are 13 prefectures and 62 provinces. They are subdivisions of the 12 regions of Morocco. Each prefecture or province is subdivided into arrondissements (only in prefectures of some metropolitan areas),  municipalities (communes, sing. commune) or urban municipalities (communes urbaines, sing. commune urbaine) in other urban areas, and districts (cercles, sing. cercle) in rural areas. The districts are subdivided into rural municipalities (communes rurales, sing. commune rural). One prefecture (Casablanca) is also subdivided into préfectures d'arrondissements (sing. préfecture d'arrondissements), similar to districts (cercles) except they are grouping a few arrondissements instead of rural municipalities.

Note: The arrondissements and (urban) municipalities should probably be thought of as fourth-level subdivisions, on the same level as the rural municipalities, but they are not part of any district.

List of prefectures and provinces

Mainland Morocco

Tanger-Tetouan-Al Hoceima Region 
 M'diq-Fnideq Prefecture
 Tangier-Assilah Prefecture
 Al Hoceïma Province
 Chefchaouen Province
 Fahs-Anjra Province
 Larache Province
 Ouezzane Province
 Tétouan Province

Oriental Region 
 Prefecture of Oujda-Angad
 Berkane Province
 Driouch Province
 Figuig Province
 Guercif Province
 Jerada Province
 Nador Province
 Taourirt Province

Fès-Meknès Region 
 Prefecture of Fès
 Prefecture of Meknès
 Boulemane Province
 El Hajeb Province
 Ifrane Province
 Sefrou Province
 Taounate Province
 Taza Province
 Moulay Yacoub Province

Rabat-Salé-Kénitra Region 
 Prefecture of Rabat
 Prefecture of Salé
 Prefecture of Skhirat-Témara
 Kénitra Province
 Khémisset Province
 Sidi Kacem Province
 Sidi Slimane Province

Béni Mellal-Khénifra Region 
 Azilal Province
 Béni-Mellal Province
 Fquih Ben Salah Province
 Khénifra Province
 Khouribga Province

Casablanca-Settat Region 
 Prefecture of Casablanca
 Prefecture of arrondissements of Casablanca Anfa
 Prefecture of arrondissements of Al Fida - Mers Sultan
 Prefecture of arrondissements of Aïn Sebaâ - Hay Mohammadi
 Prefecture of arrondissement of Hay Hassani
 Prefecture of arrondissement of Aïn Chock
 Prefecture of arrondissements of Sidi Bernoussi
 Prefecture of arrondissements of Ben M'Sick
 Prefecture of arrondissements of Moulay Rachid
 Prefecture of Mohammedia
 Ben Slimane Province
 Berrechid Province
 El Jadida Province
 Médiouna Province
 Nouaceur Province
 Settat Province
 Sidi Bennour Province

Marrakech-Safi Region 
 Prefecture of Marrakech (fr)
 Al Haouz Province
 Chichaoua Province
 El Kelâat Es-Sraghna Province
 Essaouira Province
 Rehamna Province
 Safi Province
 Youssoufia Province

Drâa-Tafilalet Region 
 Errachidia Province
 Midelt Province
 Ouarzazate Province
 Tinghir Province
 Zagora Province

Souss-Massa Region 
 Prefecture of Agadir-Ida Ou Tanane
 Prefecture of Inezgane-Aït Melloul
 Chtouka Aït Baha Province
 Taroudant Province
 Tata Province
 Tiznit Province

Western Sahara (most under de facto Moroccan administration) 

Most of Western Sahara is administered de facto by Morocco (where the area is informally named the Southern Provinces by the Moroccan government and media); the rest is administered by the Sahrawi Arab Democratic Republic.

The United Nations considers the territory to be disputed, as it was not legally transferred by Spain when it abandoned its former colony in 1975, and several states (notably members of the African Union) either recognize the SADR as the sole legitimate government of Western Sahara, or consider that the status of the region (either as an independent state, or as part of Morocco, or as part of Mauritania that initially claimed a part of it) has still not been autodetermined by the local population prior to its annexation. The United Nations has no legal instruments confirming the claims on the region made by the governments of Morocco or the self-proclaimed SADR, and in international treaties, it is still a formal part of Spain that remains to be properly decolonized, even though Spain and Mauritania no longer claim any part of it.

Since the annexation, the situation is worsened by the fact that most of the historic Western Saharan population has fled either to the remaining free zone (now isolated by the Moroccan militarized berm) or to refugee camps in neighbouring countries (notably  Algeria), due to lack of resources in the free zone. The remaining native Western Saharan population now lives as a minority among the new Moroccan occupants. The absence of a legal government with a permanent administration in the free zone has also introduced a threat to the security of the surrounding countries in the Saharan and Sahel regions, including Morocco itself.

Guelmim-Oued Noun Region 
 Assa-Zag Province (partly located in Western Sahara)
 Sidi Ifni Province (located in Mainland Morocco)
 Guelmim Province (located in Mainland Morocco)
 Tan-Tan Province (located in Mainland Morocco)

Laâyoune-Sakia El Hamra Region 
 Boujdour Province
 Es Semara Province
 Laâyoune Province
 Tarfaya Province (partly located in Mainland Morocco)

Dakhla-Oued Ed-Dahab Region 
 Aousserd Province
 Oued Ed-Dahab Province

Before 2015

Mainland Morocco

Chaouia-Ouardigha Region 
 Ben Slimane Province
 Berrechid Province
 Khouribga Province
 Settat Province

Greater Casablanca Region 
 Prefecture of Casablanca
 Prefecture of Mohammedia
 Médiouna Province
 Nouaceur Province

Tadla-Azilal Region 
 Azilal Province
 Béni-Mellal Province
 Fquih Ben Salah Province

Doukkala-Abda Region 
 El Jadida Province
 Safi Province
 Sidi Bennour Province
 Youssoufia Province

Marrakech-Tensift-El Haouz Region 
 Prefecture of Marrakesh-Medina
 Prefecture of Marrakesh-Menara
 Prefecture of Sidi Youssef Ben Ali
 Al Haouz Province
 Chichaoua Province
 El Kelâat Es-Sraghna Province
 Essaouira Province
 Rehamna Province

Fès-Boulemane Region 
 Prefecture of Fès-Dar-Dbibegh
 Moulay Yacoub Province
 Sefrou Province
 Boulemane Province

Taza-Al Hoceima-Taounate Region 
 Al Hoceïma Province
 Taounate Province
 Taza Province
 Guercif Province

Gharb-Chrarda-Béni Hssen Region 
 Kénitra Province
 Sidi Kacem Province
 Sidi Slimane Province

Rabat-Salé-Zemmour-Zaer Region 
 Prefecture of Rabat
 Prefecture of Salé
 Prefecture of Skhirat-Témara
 Khémisset Province

Tangier-Tétouan Region 
 Tangier Sub-Region
 Prefecture of Tangier-Assilah
 Fahs-Anjra Province
 Tétouan Sub-Region
 Prefecture of M'diq-Fnideq
 Chefchaouen Province
 Larache Province
 Ouezzane Province
 Tétouan Province

Oriental Region 
 Prefecture of Oujda-Angad
 Berkane Province
 Driouch Province
 Figuig Province
 Jerada Province
 Nador Province
 Taourirt Province

Meknès-Tafilalet Region 
 Prefecture of Meknès
 El Hajeb Province
 Errachidia Province
 Ifrane Province
 Khénifra Province
 Midelt Province

Souss-Massa-Drâa Region 
 Prefecture of Agadir-Ida Ou Tanane
 Prefecture of Inezgane-Aït Melloul
 Chtouka Aït Baha Province
 Ouarzazate Province
 Taroudant Province
 Zagora Province
 Sidi Ifni Province
 Tiznit Province
 Tinghir Province

Moroccan Sahara (most under de facto Moroccan administration)

Guelmim-Es Semara Region 
 Assa-Zag Province (located in Mainland Morocco)
 Es Semara Province
 Guelmim Province (located in Mainland Morocco)
 Tan-Tan Province (located in Mainland Morocco)
 Tata Province (located in Mainland Morocco)

Laâyoune-Boujdour-Sakia El Hamra Region 
 Boujdour Province
 Laâyoune Province
 Tarfaya Province

Oued Ed-Dahab-Lagouira Region 
 Aousserd Province
 Oued Ed-Dahab Province

Wilaya 
In Morocco, a wilaya is an administrative division created in 1981 that "brings together many provinces or prefectures or both at the same time, and is intended to endow big urban units such as Casablanca with an administrative organization capable of meeting the needs that emerge from these expanding cities and their growing populations." Therefore, strictly speaking, the level of wilayas are between the regions and prefectures/provinces (although wilayas only cover urban areas). However, they are often used synonymous with regions or prefectures/provinces in common usage.

See also 
 Regions of Morocco
 List of administrative divisions of Morocco by population (2004)
 List of administrative divisions of Morocco by area (2004)
 ISO 3166-2:MA (2004)

References

External links 
 ISO Administrative divisions
 

Morocco, Prefectures
Geography of Morocco
Government of Morocco
Morocco, Prefectures
Morocco geography-related lists
Subdivisions of Morocco